This article lists military bases of Russia abroad. The majority of Russia's military bases and facilities are located in former Soviet republics; which in Russian political parlance is termed the "near abroad".

Following the dissolution of the Soviet Union, many of the early-warning radar stations ended up in former Soviet republics. As of 2020, only the radar in Belarus is still rented by Russia.

In 2003, Kommersant newspaper published a map of the Russian military presence abroad. In 2018, it was reported that Russia operates at least 21 significant military facilities overseas.

Map

Current bases

Former bases

Planned

See also 
 Wagner Group 
 Power projection
 List of Soviet Union military bases abroad
 List of United States military bases
 List of countries with overseas military bases

References

 
Bas